In ring theory, a branch of mathematics, a ring is called a reduced ring if it has no non-zero nilpotent elements.  Equivalently, a ring is reduced if it has no non-zero elements with square zero, that is, x2 = 0 implies x = 0. A commutative algebra over a commutative ring is called a reduced algebra if its underlying ring is reduced.   

The nilpotent elements of a commutative ring R form an ideal of R, called the nilradical of R; therefore a commutative ring is reduced if and only if its nilradical is zero. Moreover, a commutative ring is reduced if and only if the only element contained in all prime ideals is zero.

A quotient ring R/I is reduced if and only if I is a radical ideal.

Let  be nilradical of any commutative ring . There is a natural functor  of category of commutative rings  into category of reduced rings  and it is left adjoint to the inclusion functor  of  into  . The bijection  is induced from the universal property of quotient rings.

Let D be the set of all zero-divisors in a reduced ring R. Then D is the union of all minimal prime ideals.

Over a Noetherian ring R, we say a finitely generated module M has locally constant rank if  is a locally constant (or equivalently continuous) function on Spec R. Then R is reduced if and only if every finitely generated module of locally constant rank is projective.

Examples and non-examples
 Subrings, products, and localizations of reduced rings are again reduced rings.
 The ring of integers Z is a reduced ring. Every field and every polynomial ring over a field (in arbitrarily many variables) is a reduced ring.
 More generally, every integral domain is a reduced ring since a nilpotent element is a fortiori a zero-divisor. On the other hand, not every reduced ring is an integral domain. For example, the ring Z[x, y]/(xy) contains x + (xy) and y + (xy) as zero-divisors, but no non-zero nilpotent elements. As another example, the ring Z × Z contains (1, 0) and (0, 1) as zero-divisors, but contains no non-zero nilpotent elements.
 The ring Z/6Z is reduced, however Z/4Z is not reduced: The class 2 + 4Z is nilpotent.  In general, Z/nZ is reduced if and only if n = 0 or n is a square-free integer.
 If R is a commutative ring and N is the nilradical of R, then the quotient ring R/N is reduced.
 A commutative ring R of characteristic p for some prime number p is reduced if and only if its Frobenius endomorphism is injective (cf. Perfect field.)

Generalizations
Reduced rings play an elementary role in algebraic geometry, where this concept is generalized to the concept of a reduced scheme.

See also
Total quotient ring#The total ring of fractions of a reduced ring

Notes

References
 N. Bourbaki, Commutative Algebra, Hermann Paris 1972, Chap. II, § 2.7
 N. Bourbaki, Algebra, Springer 1990, Chap. V, § 6.7
 Eisenbud, David, Commutative Algebra with a View Toward Algebraic Geometry, Graduate Texts in Mathematics, 150, Springer-Verlag, 1995, .

Ring theory

pl:Element nilpotentny#Pierścień zredukowany